William Frederick Campbell, 2nd Baron Stratheden, 2nd Baron Campbell (15 October 1824 – 21 January 1893), was a British peer and Liberal politician. His father was the Lord Chancellor.

Background
Stratheden and Campbell was the eldest son of Lord Chancellor John Campbell, 1st Baron Campbell, and Mary Elizabeth, 1st Baroness Stratheden, daughter of James Scarlett, 1st Baron Abinger. He was educated at Eton College and Balliol College, Oxford and Trinity College, Cambridge. He was awarded his M.A. in 1846.

Political career
Stratheden and Campbell was elected Member of Parliament for Cambridge in 1847, a seat he held until 1852, and later represented Harwich from 1859 to 1860. The latter year he succeeded his mother in the barony of Stratheden and entered the House of Lords. The following year he also inherited the barony of Campbell on the death of his father.

Personal life
Lord Stratheden and Campbell dined at the Reform Club and had residences at Hartrigge House in Jedburgh and Stratheden House in Knightsbridge. He died at Wandsworth, Surrey, on 15 January 1893, aged 66. He never married and was succeeded in the baronies by his younger brother, Hallyburton.

References

External links 
 

 

1824 births
1893 deaths
People educated at Eton College
Alumni of Balliol College, Oxford
Alumni of Trinity College, Cambridge
Barons in the Peerage of the United Kingdom
Eldest sons of British hereditary barons
Liberal Party (UK) MPs for English constituencies
UK MPs 1847–1852
UK MPs 1859–1865
UK MPs who inherited peerages